Nasrullah Mosque is a 16th-century Ottoman mosque in Kastamonu, Turkey.

It is located in Kastamonu just west of the Kastamonu Governor's Office and Gök River.

The mosque was commissioned by Kadı Nasrullah, a judge of the Ottoman Empire. It was built in 1506, during the reign of Sultan Beyazıt II. The building underwent restorations in 1746, 1845 and 1945.

The narthex has seven domes over ten columns. The pretentious public fountain of the mosque is in the courtyard to the north of the mosque. The mosque has two minarets.

References

Ottoman mosques in Turkey
Kastamonu
Buildings and structures in Kastamonu Province
Mosques completed in 1506
1506 establishments in the Ottoman Empire
Mosque buildings with domes
Mosques in Kastamonu
16th-century mosques
Mosque architecture